I dag begynder livet is a 1939 Danish family film directed by Lau Lauritzen Jr. and Alice O'Fredericks.

Cast
Sigfred Johansen as Peter Sommer
Berthe Qvistgaard as Korpigen Vera Holm
Eigil Reimers as Danseinstruktør Børge Ravn
Bodil Steen as Karin Sommer
Ib Schønberg as Betjent Emil Lundstrøm
Maria Garland as Johanne Lundstrøm
Tove Arni as Korpigen Margot
Lise Thomsen as Korpigen Nelly
Sigrid Horne-Rasmussen as Korpigen Ditten Larsen
Tove Wallenstrøm as Laura, chorus girl
Per Gundmann as Pianist
Kaj Mervild as Kriminalassistent Klitgaard
Hans Egede Budtz as Kriminalkommisær Frederiksen

References

External links

1939 films
1939 drama films
1930s Danish-language films
Danish black-and-white films
Films directed by Lau Lauritzen Jr.
Films directed by Alice O'Fredericks
Danish drama films